Szpak is a Polish surname. Notable people with the surname include:

Damian Szpak (born 1993), Polish footballer
Michał Szpak (born 1990), Polish singer
Robert Szpak (born 1989), Polish athlete, who specialises in the javelin throw

See also
LWD Szpak, Polish utility aircraft of 1945, the first Polish aircraft designed after World War II and built in a short series